I-42 was an Imperial Japanese Navy Type B2 submarine. Completed and commissioned in 1943, she served in World War II and was sunk during her first war patrol in March 1944.

Construction and commissioning

I-42 was laid down on 18 March 1942 at the Kure Navy Yard at Kure, Japan, with the name Submarine No. 372. Renamed I-42 on 20 August 1942 and provisionally attached to the Yokosuka Naval District that day, she was launched on 10 November 1942. She was completed and commissioned on 3 November 1943.

Service history
Upon commissioning, I-42 was attached formally to the Yokosuka Naval District. On 31 January 1944, she was reassigned to Submarine Division 15 in the 6th Fleet.

On 12 February 1944, I-42 departed Yokosuka on her first war patrol, assigned a patrol area northeast of Truk. She reached her patrol area on 20 February 1944. She called at Saipan in the Mariana Islands from 3 to 4 March 1944, then proceeded to Truk, where she arrived on 7 March 1944. She got back underway on 15 March 1944 to make a supply run to Palau, which she reached on 19 March 1944. After embarking cargo and passengers, she departed Palau on 23 March 1944 on a supply run to Rabaul on New Britain, with an estimated date of arrival of 30 March 1944.

Also on the surface, Tunny closed to within visual range and identified I-42 as a Japanese I-boat. I-42 also sighted Tunny, and for almost 90 minutes each submarine maneuvered on the surface to obtain a firing position against the other while trying to deny one to her opponent. Just before Tunny′s hatch closed, her crew saw a bright flash and felt and heard two explosions. Tunny′s crew heard the noises of I-42 breaking up for the next hour.

On 27 April 1944, the Imperial Japanese Navy declared I-42 to be presumed lost with all hands north of the Admiralty Islands. She was stricken from the Navy list on 30 April 1944.

Notes

Sources
 Hackett, Bob & Kingsepp, Sander.  IJN Submarine I-42: Tabular Record of Movement.  Retrieved on September 5, 2020.

Type B2 submarines
Ships built by Kure Naval Arsenal
1942 ships
World War II submarines of Japan
Japanese submarines lost during World War II
Ships lost with all hands
Submarines sunk by submarines
Ships sunk by American submarines
Maritime incidents in March 1944
Shipwrecks in the Philippine Sea
World War II shipwrecks in the Pacific Ocean